Homonota marthae is a species of gecko. This newly described species is only known from Paraguay. The specific name marthae honors Martha Motte, a Paraguayan herpetologist.

References

Homonota
Reptiles of Paraguay
Endemic fauna of Paraguay
Reptiles described in 2018
Taxa named by Gunther Köhler